Ampelamus is a genus of plants in the family Apocynaceae, first described in 1819. It is native to Colombia and to eastern North America.

Species
 Ampelamus laevis (Michx.) Krings (synonyms A. albidus, A. riparius, Cynanchum laeve, Gonolobus laevis, Vincetoxicum gonocarpos var. laevis) -  C + E United States, Ontario
 Ampelamus volubilis (Turcz.) Dugand (synonyms Enslenia volubilis, Gonolobus volubilis, Nematuris volubilis) - Colombia

formerly included
transferred to Cynanchum 
Ampelamus ligulatus (Benth.) A.Heller, synonym of Cynanchum ligulatum (Benth.) Woodson

References

 
Apocynaceae genera
Taxa named by Constantine Samuel Rafinesque